Bombardier Glacier is a glacier draining southeast from the edge of Detroit Plateau on Nordenskjöld Coast in Graham Land, Antarctica and through a deep trough between Darzalas Peak and Trave Peak to join Edgeworth Glacier and flow into Mundraga Bay. It was mapped from surveys by the Falkland Islands Dependencies Survey (1960–1961), and named by the UK Antarctic Place-Names Committee for Joseph-Armand Bombardier, the Canadian engineer who developed the snowmobile from 1926 to 1937, one of the earliest successful self-propelled over-snow vehicles.

See also
 List of glaciers in the Antarctic
 Glaciology

References
 

Glaciers of Nordenskjöld Coast